Air Vice-Marshal Sir Christopher Joseph Quintin Brand,  (25 May 1893 – 7 March 1968) was a South African officer of the Royal Air Force.

Early life
Brand was born in Beaconsfield (now part of Kimberley, Northern Cape) in South Africa to a CID Inspector in the Johannesburg police. He joined the South African Defence Force in 1913.

First World War
During the years 1914–1915, Brand continued to serve in the Union Defence Force.

In 1915, Brand travelled to England, where he transferred to the Royal Flying Corps. He learned to fly and was awarded Royal Aero Club Certificate No 3949 on 30 March 1916.  During the First World War, he flew Nieuport 17 scouts, serving in No. 1 Squadron RFC in France as a flight commander before being posted back to England.

In February 1918, Brand became commander 112 Squadron, a home defence night fighter squadron equipped with specially modified Sopwith Camels flying from Throwley in Kent, shooting down a Gotha bomber over Faversham on 19 May. He was then appointed commander of No. 151 Squadron RAF at Fontaine-sur-Maye in France, a night fighter squadron formed to combat German night raids over the Western Front.   The squadron downed 26 German aircraft with Brand himself shooting down four, becoming the highest scoring RAF night fighter pilot of the First World War. Brand claimed 12 victories in 1917 and 1918 (seven victories with No 1 Squadron, four with 151 Squadron and one with 112 Squadron) and was awarded the Distinguished Flying Cross during this period.

Inter-war years
In 1920, The Times offered a prize of £10,000 for the first pilot to fly from London to Cape Town, South Africa. General Smuts wanted South African aviators to blaze this trail, and subsequently authorised the purchase of a Vickers Vimy, G-UABA named Silver Queen at a cost of £4,500. Pilots Lieutenant Colonel Pierre van Ryneveld (commander) and Captain Quintin Brand (co-pilot) formed the crew for the record-breaking flight.

Leaving Brooklands on 4 February 1920, they landed safely at Heliopolis, but on the flight to Wadi Halfa, they were forced to land due to engine overheating with 80 miles still to go. A second Vimy was loaned to the pair by the RAF at Heliopolis (and named Silver Queen II). In this second aircraft, the pair continued to Bulawayo in Southern Rhodesia where the aircraft was badly damaged when it crashed on takeoff.; van Rynevald and Brand then borrowed an Airco DH.9 to continue the journey to Cape Town. They were disqualified as winners but nevertheless the South African government awarded them £5,000 each. Along with van Rynevald, Brand was knighted in 1920 for his role in the record attempt.

From 1925 to 1927, Brand was Senior Technical Officer, then Principal Technical Officer, at the Royal Aircraft Establishment, Farnborough. In 1929, he was posted to Abu Qir (Aboukir) Egypt, later appointed Director-General of Aviation in Egypt from 1932 to 1936.

Second World War
During the Second World War, Brand was air officer commanding No. 10 (Fighter) Group, 10 Fighter Battle Group, responsible for the defence of southwest England and South Wales. Brand actively supported Air Vice Marshal Keith Park, in advocating the use of small, rapidly deployed, groups of fighters to intercept the Luftwaffe raiders. Under Brand's command 10 Group played a vital role in the Battle of Britain by defending southwest England against Luftwaffe raids and providing support to 11 Group (which bore the brunt of the battle in southeast England) as required.  
He later became the air officer commanding No. 20 (Training) Group.  Upon retirement on 6 November 1943, Brand had attained the rank of air vice-marshal. Brand's part in the Big Wing controversy following the Battle of Britain, in which he supported Dowding and Park, may explain why he was sidelined despite being one of the RAF's more capable commanders.

Later years
After retiring from the regular forces, Brand married Mildred Vaughan in 1943; he had married her sister Marie in 1920, but Marie died in 1941. The Brands lived in Surrey until 1950, when they moved to Southern Rhodesia. Quintin Brand died on 7 March 1968.

Honours and awards
26 April 1917 – 2nd Lt. (temp. Capt.) Christopher Joseph Quintin Brand, RFC, Spec. Res. – awarded the Military Cross: 
31 May 1918 – Lt (T./Capt.) Christopher Joseph Quintin Brand, MC, RAF – Awarded the Distinguished Service Order for gallant services rendered on the occasion of an hostile air raid: 
14 May 1920 – Flight Lieutenant Christopher Joseph Quintin Brand, DSO, MC, DFC, Royal Air Force – Appointed a Knight Commander of the Order of the British Empire in recognition of the valuable services rendered to Aviation by the successful flight from England to Cape Town, South Africa.

Military service timeline

References
Notes

Bibliography

 Barker, Ralph. A Brief History of the Royal Flying Corps in World War One. London: Robinson Publishing, 2002. .
 Davis, Mick. Sopwith Aircraft. Ramsbury, Malborough, UK: The Crowood Press, 1999. .
 Jackson, A.J. British Civil Aircraft 1919–1972: Volume III. London: Putnam, revised second edition, 1988. .

External links

Biography on RAFWEB
Biography on The Twickenham Museum site
Biography on raf.mod.uk
Page on the Aerodrome

|-

|-

1893 births
1968 deaths
People from Kimberley, Northern Cape
Royal Flying Corps officers
British Army personnel of World War I
Royal Air Force personnel of World War II
Royal Air Force air marshals
Knights Commander of the Order of the British Empire
Companions of the Distinguished Service Order
Recipients of the Distinguished Flying Cross (United Kingdom)
Recipients of the Military Cross
Battle of Britain
South African military personnel of World War II
South African knights